Knut Gunnar Johanson (13 November 1909 – 24 May 1986) was a Swedish actor known for his frequent work with writer and director Ingmar Bergman.

Biography
Björnstrand was born Knut Gunnar Johanson in Stockholm as son of actor Oscar Johanson and Ella Mauléon. After his education at the Royal Dramatic Theatre's acting school, he made several appearances in theatre, film and radio. Björnstrand's first collaboration with Ingmar Bergman was the 1941 theatre production of August Strindberg's The Ghost Sonata. His first major film role was in Hampe Faustman's Natt i hamn in 1943. After signing a contract with Svensk Filmindustri, he was offered mainly parts in comedies, including Bergman's Smiles of a Summer Night (1955). He regularly starred in other films by Bergman until 1968, when his work for the director became infrequent. He also played major roles at the Stockholm Stadsteater and in private theaters. In later years, due to the consequences of a stroke, Björnstrand avoided long-term contracts, and focused on theatre and television work. His last film was Bergman's Fanny and Alexander (1982): since he was suffering from memory loss at the time, the production was a difficult one for him. Björnstrand died in Stockholm in 1986.

In 1983 he won the Ingmar Bergman Award at the 19th Guldbagge Awards ceremony.

Björnstrand was married to actress and writer Lillie Björnstrand. They had three daughters, Kristina, Gabrielle and Veronica Björnstrand. Veronica has also acted on stage and TV. Björnstrand was also politically active and participated in protests against the Vietnam War. He was a Roman Catholic and is buried in the Northern Cemetery of Solna.

Selected filmography 

 The False Millionaire (1931) as Member of the choir (uncredited)
 Mon coeur et ses millions (1931) as Un choriste (uncredited)
 Ship Ahoy! (1931) as Young man (uncredited)
 His Life's Match (1932) as Student carrying 'Nicken' (uncredited)
 International Match (1932) as Young student watching competition (uncredited)
 Fired (1934) as Kirre Skoglund (uncredited)
 The People of Bergslagen (1937) as Birthday guest (uncredited)
 Vi som går scenvägen (1938) as A Man (uncredited)
 Panik (1939) as Bank Manager Ryder
 The Two of Us (1939) as Doctor (uncredited)
 Mot nya tider (1939) as August Palm's Associate (uncredited)
 Heroes in Yellow and Blue (1940) as Sgt. Kristian (uncredited)
 June Night (1940) as Journalist (uncredited)
 A Real Man (1940) as Clerk (uncredited)
 Her Melody (1940) as Miss Lindenstjärnas fiance (uncredited)
 Alle man på post (1940) as Military Doctor
 The Ghost Reporter (1941) as Sausage Factory Engineer (uncredited)
 Snapphanar (1941) as Soldier (uncredited)
 Adventurer (1942) as Count Conti
 General von Döbeln (1942) as Löjtnant Bäckström
 Night in Port (1943) as Sven Eriksson
 I Killed (1943) as Lindén
 Appassionata (1944) as Svensson, Editor of Vecko-Bilden (uncredited)
 Live Dangerously (1944) as Hahn
 My People Are Not Yours (1944) as Major Rolf von Ritter
 Torment (1944, dir. Alf Sjöberg) as Teacher (uncredited)
 Nyordning på Sjögårda (1944) as Felix Palmer
 Vad vet ni om Sussie (1945) as Harry Hellberg
 I som här inträden... (1945) as Hagman
 Peggy on a Spree (1946) as Harald Haraldsson
 Kristin Commands (1946) as Dr. Westman Senior / Vilhelm Westman
 Incorrigible (1946) as Dr. Bertil Langenfeldt
 It Rains on Our Love (1946) as Mr. Purman
 While the Door Was Locked (1946) as Erik Sahlen
 The Bride Came Through the Ceiling (1947) as Sune Eriksson
 Pappa sökes (1947) as Shoe-shiner Tom, 'Plutten'
 Soldier's Reminder (1947) as Sgt. Löfgren
 One Swallow Does Not Make a Summer (1947) as 40-talisten
 Här kommer vi... (1947) as Actor Bob Hill, aka Robert Berg
 Two Women (1947) as Bengt Larsson
 Music in Darkness (1948) as Klasson
 Each to His Own Way (1948) as Sture Widman
 A Swedish Tiger (1948) as Hans Wolff
 Lilla Märta kommer tillbaka (1948) as Kaptenen
 Private Bom (1948) as Korpral Berglund
 Playing Truant (1949) as Bertil Kronberg
 The Girl from the Third Row (1949) as Dr. Edvin Burelius
 Father Bom (1949) as Sportsman Fritjof Krafft
 My Sister and I (1950) as Architect Gunnar Stenwall
 Fiancée for Hire (1950) as Actor Julius Brumse
 The Kiss on the Cruise (1950) as Film Director Lasse Brenner
 The Quartet That Split Up (1950) as Engineer Planertz
 The White Cat (1950) as Jarl Eksell
 Customs Officer Bom (1951) as Frans Melin, aka Hamn-Casanova
 The Nuthouse (1951) as Armékapten
 Livat på luckan (1951) as Conscript
 Say It with Flowers (1952) as Oskar Blomkvist
 Möte med livet (1952) as Narrator (voice)
 One Fiancée at a Time (1952) as Valentin Fredriksson-Frisk
 Secrets of Women (1952) as Fredrik Lobelius
 Bom the Flyer (1952) as Sgt. Niklas Slevbrink
 The Green Lift (1952) as Malte Lövman
 Dance, My Doll (1953) as Zdenko Zapatil
 We Three Debutantes (1953) as Director Brummer
 Sawdust and Tinsel (1953) as Mr. Sjuberg
 The Glass Mountain (1953) as Dr. Dalander
 Flottans glada gossar (1954) as Shipowner Ludvig Ekman
 Seger i mörker (1954) as Henrik Kugelström
 A Lesson in Love (1954) as David Erneman
 Gabrielle (1954) as Robert Holmén
 Uncle's (1955) as Acke Kullerstedt
 Dreams (1955) as Otto Sönderby, Consul
 Smiles of a Summer Night (1955) as Fredrik Egerman
 Det är aldrig för sent (1956) as Professor Rocke
 Seventh Heaven (1956) as Ernst C:son Kruuse, major
 The Biscuit (1956) as Freddie Braxenhjelm
 The Seventh Seal (1957) as Jöns, squire
 Night Light (1957, dir. Lars-Eric Kjellgren) as Mr. Purman
 Summer Place Wanted (1957) as Lawyer Gustaf Dahlström
 Wild Strawberries (1957) as Dr. Evald Borg
 You Are My Adventure (1958) as Tore Hall
 Miss April (1958) as Marcus Arwidson
 The Magician (1958) as Dr. Vergerus, Minister of Health
 Swinging at the Castle (1959) as Agne C:son Stressberg
 Crime in Paradise (1959) as Adam 'A.P.' Palmquist
 Heaven and Pancake (1959) as Ernst C:son Kruuse
 Pirates on the Malonen (1959) as 'Greven'
 The Devil's Eye (1960) as Actor
 Through a Glass Darkly (1961) as David
 The Pleasure Garden (1961, dir. Alf Kjellin) as David Samuel Franzén
 Winter Light (1962) as Tomas Ericsson
 Lyckodrömmen (1963) as Sebastian
 Min kära är en ros (1963) as Georg Ehnström
 The Dress (1964) as Helmer Berg
 Äktenskapsbrottaren (1964) as Herr Fotograf Fäger
 Loving Couples (1964) as Dr. Jacob Lewin
 My Sister, My Love (1966) as Count Schwartz
 Träfracken (1966) as Dr. Rune Wester
 Persona (1966) as Mr. Vogler
 Here Is Your Life (1966) as Lundgren
 Hagbard and Signe (1967) as King Sigvor
 Stimulantia (1967) as Paul Hartman
 Tofflan (1967) as Engineer Morgan Alm
 The Girls (1968) as Hugo
 Shame (1968) as överste Jacobi, borgmästare
 Pappa varför är du arg? Du gjorde likadant själv när du var ung (1968) as Adm. Carl
 The Rite (1969, TV Movie) as Hans Winkelmann
 Blow Hot, Blow Cold (1969) as Prof. Gunnar Lindmark
 Lockfågeln (1971) as Maj. Swedenhielm
 Pistol (1973) as Alisia's Friend
 Face to Face (1976) as The Grandfather
 Tabu (1977) as Rådmanskan
 Autumn Sonata (1978) as Paul
 Charlotte Löwensköld (1979) as Rural Dean Forsius
 Avskedet (1982) as  Morfadern
 Fanny and Alexander (1982) as Filip Landahl - Teatern

References

External links

 
 Gunnar Björnstrand page at Bergmanorama 

1909 births
1986 deaths
Male actors from Stockholm
Swedish male film actors
20th-century Swedish male actors
Burials at Norra begravningsplatsen